The Victoria Building is an Art Deco office building in Ottawa, Ontario, Canada. It is located at 140 Wellington Street, just across from the Parliament of Canada. It houses the offices of a number of parliamentarians, mostly members of the Senate of Canada. The building, designed by John Albert Ewart, was completed in 1928 by private developers, though the federal government quickly leased much of it. It has held a wide variety of tenants. It was the first home of the Embassy of France (1928-1939) and the Bank of Canada from 1935 to 1938. It also housed the Japanese legation in 1931. From 1938 to 1964 it housed the CBC and for a time was also the home of Ashbury College. The federal government took over the building in 1973 and in 2003 it was renovated.

See also

 Edward Drake Building, home to CBC after moving from Victoria Building in 1964

References

Art Deco architecture in Canada
Office buildings in Canada
Office buildings completed in 1928
Parliament of Canada buildings
Canada–France relations
Ottawa
Canadian Broadcasting Corporation buildings
1928 establishments in Ontario